The chief minister of the National Capital Territory of Delhi is the head of government of the National Capital Territory of Delhi. According to the Constitution of India, the lieutenant governor is the National Capital Territory of Delhi's de jure head, but de facto executive authority rests with its chief minister. Following elections to the Delhi Legislative Assembly, the lieutenant governor usually invites the party with a majority of seats to form the government. The president of India, on the advice of the lieutenant governor, appoints the chief minister, whose council of ministers are collectively responsible to the assembly. Given that the person has the confidence of the assembly, the chief minister's term is for five years and is subject to no term limits.

History
Since 1952, National Capital Territory of Delhi has had 7 chief ministers, starting with the Indian National Congress party's Chaudhary Brahm Prakash. Shortly after his term ended, the office of chief minister of the National Capital Territory of Delhi was abolished for 37 years until 2 December 1993, when the Bharatiya Janata Party's Madan Lal Khurana was sworn in. The longest-serving chief minister, Sheila Dikshit from the Indian National Congress party held the office for over fifteen years. On 28 December 2013, Arvind Kejriwal of Aam Aadmi Party sworn in as first state party chief minister of the national capital territory. There have been one instance of president's rule in National Capital Territory of Delhi, most recently in 2015.

Arvind Kejriwal of Aam Aadmi Party is the incumbent chief minister of Delhi since 14 February 2015.

Official residence
Since 2014, CM Kejriwal resides at Bhagwan Das Road in central Delhi. The location is close to the Delhi Secretariat.

List  
 

Key
  Assassinated or died in office
  Returned to office after a previous non-consecutive term
  Resigned

Notes

See also 

 List of current Indian chief ministers
 History of the National Capital Territory of Delhi
 Elections in the National Capital Territory of Delhi
 National Capital Territory of Delhi Legislative Assembly
 List of lieutenant governors of the National Capital Territory of Delhi
 List of deputy chief ministers of the National Capital Territory of Delhi

References

External links 
  Official Website of the Office of the Chief Minister

Delhi
Chief Ministers of Delhi
People from Delhi
Delhi-related lists